Tisleifjorden is a lake on the border of Innlandet and Viken counties in Norway. The lake lies in Nord-Aurdal municipality in Innlandet county, as well in Gol and Hemsedal municipalities in Viken county. Tisleifjorden is dammed for hydroelectric power.

Dam
Tisleifjorden Dam creates a reservoir for the Åbjøra kraftverk hydro-electric power plant along the Aurdalsfjorden near the village of Aurdal. The power plant was built from 1949-1951 and it was rebuilt in 2002. Åbjøra kraftverk is operated by Skagerak Energi.

See also
List of lakes in Norway

References

Gol, Norway
Hemsedal
Nord-Aurdal
Lakes of Innlandet
Lakes of Viken (county)
Reservoirs in Norway